Jack Mitchell is a jockey from Epsom, Surrey who has received media coverage as an up-and-coming jockey, especially after his victory in the 2010 Derby Dash at The Derby. His father, Phillip Mitchell, is a former amateur jockey.

Background
Mitchell was taught to ride by his mother, Patricia. His father, Phillip Mitchell, had a considerable career as an amateur jockey. Living on Epsom Downs, practically on The Derby racecourse, the family has produced multiple notable jockeys, going as far back as his grandfather, Cyril Mitchell, who began his career in 1929. His younger brother Freddie is one of the top pony-race jockeys in the country.

Racing career
As of June 2010, Mitchell has competed in over 800 races and had over 90 wins, including 5 wins (out of 18 races) on his home course of Epsom.

In 2009, Mitchell was rushed to hospital after falling from a horse during a race, but was not seriously injured. Riding a horse named 'Bertoliver', He won the 2010 Investec Entrepreneurial Class "Dash" despite his saddle slipping during the race.

Mitchell was also banned from racing back in 2011 due to his relentless addiction to cocaine, which shows in his physical stature even 12 years later. 
Once a cheat, always a cheat.

References

English jockeys
Sportspeople from Epsom
Living people
Year of birth missing (living people)